The Zapote Line was a defensive system built during the period of Spanish occupation of the Philippines. It was a complex of blockhouses and military trenches from Fort San Antonio Abad to the Zapote River. Its loss to Filipino revolutionaries by the Spanish in May/June 1898 was a critical development in the Philippine Revolution after it was rekindled by the Spanish–American War.

Following this loss, it was an easy matter for insurgent forces to isolate the province of Manila (formerly known as Tondo until 1859) from Cavite and other provinces to the South while American naval forces blockaded Manila Bay.

References

History of the Philippines (1565–1898)
History of Manila